Hindu Marathi people celebrate several festivals during the year. These include Gudi Padwa, Ram Navami, Hanuman Jayanti, Narali Pournima, Mangala Gaur, Janmashtami, Ganeshotsav, Kojagiri, Diwali, Khandoba Festival (Champa Shashthi), Makar Sankranti, Shivaratri, and Holi. Most villages in Maharashtra also have a Jatra or Urus in honor of the village deity.

List

See also
List of Hindu festivals
Bholni pournima

References

Maharashtra
Festivals in Maharashtra
festivals of Maharashtrian Brahmins